D62 is a state road running parallel to a section of A1 motorway route between Šestanovac, Vrgorac and Mali Prolog, and parallel to the A10 motorway after Mali Prolog. The road provides access to the Mali Prolog border crossing to Bosnia and Herzegovina via the D222 state road.

The road generally serves as a connecting road to the A1 motorway as it is connected to Šestanovac, Zagvozd, Blato na Cetini, Ravča, Vrgorac and Ploče interchanges via short connector roads or other state or county roads.

The road, as well as all other state roads in Croatia, is managed and maintained by Hrvatske ceste, a state-owned company.

Traffic volume 

Traffic is regularly counted and reported by Hrvatske ceste, operator of the road. Substantial variations between annual (AADT) and summer (ASDT) traffic volumes are attributed to the fact that the road serves as a connection to A1 motorway carrying substantial tourist traffic to D512 and D425 state roads.

Road junctions and populated areas

Sources

D062
D062
D062